Saffery Islands is a group of islands extending west from Black Head, off the west coast of Graham Land. Charted by the British Graham Land Expedition (BGLE) under Rymill, 1934–37. Named by the United Kingdom Antarctic Place-Names Committee (UK-APC) for J.H. Saffery, Deputy Leader and Flying Manager of the Falkland Islands and Dependencies Aerial Survey Expedition (FIDASE) which photographed part of the area in 1955–57.

References

See also 
 List of Antarctic and sub-Antarctic islands
 Whit Rock

Islands of Graham Land
Graham Coast